Albert Edward Harry Meyer Archibald Primrose, 6th Earl of Rosebery, 2nd Earl of Midlothian,  (8 January 1882 – 31 May 1974), styled Lord Dalmeny until 1929, was a British liberal politician who briefly served as Secretary of State for Scotland in 1945. He was the Member of Parliament for Midlothian from 1906 to 1910. He became the Earl of Rosebery and Midlothian in 1929 and was thus a member of the House of Lords until his death.

Early life and education
He was born at Dalmeny House west of Edinburgh on 8 January 1882. His parents were Archibald Primrose, 5th Earl of Rosebery, Liberal Prime Minister of the United Kingdom (from 1894 to 1895) and Hannah Primrose, Countess of Rosebery, a member of the Rothschild family.

He was the brother of Neil Primrose and the writer Lady Sybil Grant.

He was educated at Eton then undertook military training at the Royal Military College, Sandhurst.

Military career
Lord Dalmeny was commissioned into the Grenadier Guards as a Second lieutenant 12 February 1902.

During the First World War, he served in France from 1914 to 1917 as Camp Commandant and ADC to General Allenby and subsequently in Palestine as Allenby's Military Secretary.

Cricket career
As Lord Dalmeny he was a prominent cricketer. He played two first-class matches for Middlesex in 1902.  He served as captain of Surrey from 1905 to 1907. He played in 102 first-class matches in all, scoring 3551 runs at an average of 22.47, including two centuries. His highest score was 138 against Leicestershire in 1905, when he added 260 for the sixth wicket in 130 minutes with J. N. Crawford. He was a hitter of notable power and though never consistent he could on occasions "knock the best bowling all over the field", as when he hit 58 against Nottinghamshire on a difficult wicket at The Oval in 1905. Against Essex in 1906 he scored 52 in 37 minutes in the first innings and 58 not out in 45 minutes in the second.

Rosebery was also a notable race-horse owner. He won The Derby with Blue Peter and Ocean Swell, and won most other classic British flat races, with horses bred at his Mentmore and Crafton Studs.

Political career and later life

He commenced his political career by being elected Liberal Member of Parliament for the Scottish seat of Edinburghshire. This was a county, better known by its modern name of Midlothian, which was an area where the Roseberys had long been prominent landowners. Dalmeny was one of almost 400 Liberals returned in the great landslide victory of the 1906 election. He retired from the House of Commons in January 1910. At the time of his death he was the last survivor of the 1906 Liberal MPs.

Rosebery entered the House of Lords on the death of his father in 1929. The same year he was appointed Lord Lieutenant of Midlothian, a post he held until 1964.

In 1938 he was elected a Fellow of the Royal Society of Edinburgh. His proposers were Hugh Macmillan, Baron Macmillan, Sir Thomas Henry Holland, James Pickering Kendall and James Watt.

In February 1941, during the Second World War, he was appointed Regional Commissioner for Civil Defence in Scotland. When the wartime coalition government broke up in 1945, Winston Churchill formed a caretaker administration to hold office until the 1945 general election. The new government was composed of members of the Conservative Party and the small groups which had allied with it in the National governments in office 1931–1940. Amongst these allies was the National Liberal Party to which Rosebery belonged.

One of the most unexpected appointments Churchill made was to install Rosebery as a member of the Privy Council and Secretary of State for Scotland. Both men had served together in the Liberal Parliamentary Party in the 1906–1910 Parliament. The caretaker Ministry was in office May to July 1945. So brief was his tenure at the Scottish Office that during the Royal Commission on Scottish Affairs (1952-4) he declined to give evidence on the grounds that he did not know what to say. Reputedly, his last words prior to his departing from the Scottish Office were "Well. I didn't make a bad job of this, did I? Didn't have the time".

He was created a Knight of the Order of the Thistle (KT) in 1947 by King George VI. Rosebery was President of the National Liberal Party 1945–1957. From 1951 to 1974 he was the president of the influential Scottish conservation organisation the Cockburn Association. He was also appointed Chairman of the Royal Fine Art Commission for Scotland in 1952.

He died at Mentmore Towers in Buckinghamshire on 30 May 1974.

Family
In 1909, Harry Primrose married the strikingly beautiful Dorothy Alice Margaret Augusta Grosvenor, daughter of Lord Henry George Grosvenor and granddaughter of Hugh Grosvenor, 1st Duke of Westminster. They had a son, Archibald Ronald Primrose, Lord Dalmeny (1910–1931), and a daughter, Lady Helen Dorothy Primrose (1913–1998). They divorced in 1919.

Harry Primrose remarried in 1924, to Dame Eva Isabel Marian Strutt, daughter of the 2nd Baron Aberdare of Duffryn. Their only child, Neil Archibald Primrose, was born in 1929, and became the 7th Earl of Rosebery on the death of his father on 31 May 1974.

References

Sources
 Who's Who of British Members of Parliament, Vol. II: 1886–1918, edited by M. Stenton and S. Lees (The Harvester Press 1978)
 Pottinger, George, The Secretaries of State for Scotland, 1926-1976 (Scottish Academic Press, 1979)
 Torrance, D., The Scottish Secretaries (Birlinn, 2006)

External links
 
 The Scottish Secretaries A website dedicated to the Scottish Secretaries
 
 David Torrance's Scottish Office blog, davidtorrance.blogspot.com; accessed 18 April 2016
 Profile, content-uk.cricinfo.com; accessed 18 April 2016

1882 births
1974 deaths
British Army personnel of World War I
British racehorse owners and breeders
British sportsperson-politicians
Buckinghamshire cricketers
Children of prime ministers of the United Kingdom
Companions of the Distinguished Service Order
Midlothian, Harry Primrose, 2nd Earl of
Earls of Rosebery
Fellows of the Royal Society of Edinburgh
Gentlemen cricketers
Gentlemen of the South cricketers
Graduates of the Royal Military College, Sandhurst
Grenadier Guards officers
Jewish British politicians
Knights of the Thistle
Lord-Lieutenants of Midlothian
Marylebone Cricket Club cricketers
Members of the Parliament of the United Kingdom for Scottish constituencies
Members of the Privy Council of the United Kingdom
Middlesex cricketers
Ministers in the Churchill caretaker government, 1945
North v South cricketers
Owners of Epsom Derby winners
Presidents of Surrey County Cricket Club
Presidents of the Marylebone Cricket Club
Presidents of the Royal Scottish Geographical Society
Recipients of the Military Cross
Rothschild family
Scottish Liberal Party MPs
Scottish cricketers
Scottish people of German-Jewish descent
Secretaries of State for Scotland
Surrey cricket captains
Surrey cricketers
UK MPs 1906–1910
UK MPs who inherited peerages
Harry
People educated at Eton College